Ilie Văduva (July 21, 1934 – November 13, 1998) was a Romanian communist politician who served as the Minister of Foreign Affairs of Romania from 1985 until 1986, Minister of Foreign Trade and International Cooperation from August 26, 1986 until May 1988 and Presidential Counselor from December 1988 until December 1989. He was one of those arrested after the 1989 overthrow of the Nicolae Ceaușescu regime.

Life and political career
Văduva was born in 1934. He was an alternate member of the Central Committee of Romanian Communist Party since 1979 and became a full member in 1984. Văduva, who advised on economic issues and had no knowledge of international relations, was regarded as the protégé of the First Lady of Romania, Elena Ceaușescu. In 1985, Elena Ceaușescu selected him for the post of Minister of Foreign Affairs, replacing a more experienced and successful minister, Ștefan Andrei, previously appointed by Romanian leader and Elena's husband Nicolae Ceaușescu. Văduva served as the Minister of Foreign Affairs from November 11, 1985 until August 26, 1986, mainly promoting Elena Ceaușescu's international profile. While a minister, he was also caught in the midst of heated Romania – United States relations with increasing pressure from the United States on the Ceaușescu regime for abuse of human rights. He was removed for his ineffectiveness in international affairs of Romania and appointed Minister of Foreign Trade and International Cooperation in 1986. He held this post until May 21, 1988, when he was sacked by the Romanian leadership for his role in storing the toxic waste in the Black Sea port of Sulina, causing an environmental scandal and outrage. However, a few months later, in December 1988, he was again given a high-ranking position serving as the Presidential Counselor.

See also
Romanian Communist Party
Nicolae Ceaușescu
Foreign relations of Romania

References

1934 births
1998 deaths
People from Gorj County
Romanian Ministers of Foreign Affairs
Members of the Great National Assembly
Romanian communists
Romanian presidential advisors